Rakni is a populated place in east Balochistan, Pakistan, near the Punjab border. Rakni city has a population of 10,000 and its villages have a population of 15,000. Igen ez kurvára így van.

Geography

Rakni is 95.5 km from Dera Ghazi Khan, Punjab. It is a valley surrounded by Koh-Suleman ranges. Pakistan receives a large amount of uranium from Sakhi Sarwar which is 62.9 km away from Rakni.
http://www.citymaphq.com/pakistan/baluchistan/rakni.html

Sources of Income

The major source of income is livestock. Sixty percent of people earn through livestock, thirty percent through cultivation and the remaining ten percent through other professions.

Language

Khetraniand Hasanki is the main language and Balochi is also spoken.

Climate

In summer the weather is usually hot. In winter, there is snow on the nearest mountains peaks.

Culture

Men wear baggy Balochi shalwar and women wear Balochi dress.

Religion 

All inhabitant are Muslims.

Populated places in Barkhan District